Marvin E. Haskin (May 28, 1930 – March 1, 2009) was a physician and Professor and Chairman of the Department of Diagnostic Radiology at Hahnemann University for a total of 22 years.  He was also an author, editor, and researcher in the field of radiological medicine.  His work with Dr. J. George Teplick on the medical textbook Roentgenologic Diagnosis is considered to be one of the seminal works on radiological medicine.

Education 
Haskin graduated from Central High School in Philadelphia, and received a BA from Temple University in 1951.  He earned his medical degree from the Temple University School of Medicine in 1955 and was inducted into AOA, the National Medical Honor Society, in his junior year.

Internship and residency 
Haskin completed his internship in Diagnostic Radiology at Philadelphia General Hospital and served in the United States Air Force as Chief of Radiology at Andrews Air Force Base in Maryland.  He was a diplomate of the American Board of Radiology in 1961.

From 1961 to 1969, Haskin served as the Chief of Diagnostic Radiology at Philadelphia General Hospital.  He was an Associate Radiologist at Hahnemann Medical College and Hospital in Philadelphia, as well as Research Assistant Professor of Physiology and Biophysics at Hahnemann Hospital. From 1969 until 1991 he was Professor and Chairman of Diagnostic Radiology at Hahnemann University.

Haskin was a pioneer in the development and use of computer transmission of image and medical information systems and was responsible for bringing the CT scanner to Hahnemann, the first in Philadelphia.

Works 
Dr. Haskin is the author or editor of fifteen books, including:

Roentgenologic Diagnosis (several editions have been translated into multiple languages, including Japanese, Italian, Spanish, and Serbo-Croatian)
Surgical Radiology

Additional information 
Haskin published nine book chapters and 84 peer-reviewed papers in many scientific journals, and presented over one hundred papers at national and international scientific meetings.

Dr. Haskin was a founding member of the Society for Computer Applications in Radiology, on the Editorial Board of the Journal of Digital Imaging, and was appointed to the Executive Committee for the Medical Devices Standard Management Board (ANSI). He was also a reviewer for the American Journal of Roentgenology, the Annals of Internal Medicine, and the Journal of Digital Imaging.

He was a member of numerous local and national medical societies, including the American Association of University Radiologists, the Society of Magnetic Resonance Imaging, and the New York Academy of Sciences. He was a Fellow of the American College of Physicians, the American College of Radiology, the Philadelphia College of Physicians, and a member of the Royal College of Physicians and the Royal College of Medicine.

References

American radiologists
1930 births
Place of birth missing
2009 deaths
Place of death missing
Physicians from Philadelphia
Temple University School of Medicine alumni
United States Air Force officers